Oenomaus floreus is a species of butterfly of the family Lycaenidae. It is found in lowland and lower montane habitats with wet or deciduous forests in eastern Ecuador and Brazil.

References

Butterflies described in 1907
Eumaeini